Castegnero is a town in the province of Vicenza, Veneto, northern Italy. It is east of SP247 provincial road.

References

External links
(Google Maps)

Cities and towns in Veneto